Anja Nissen is the self-titled debut album by Anja Nissen, the winner of the third series of The Voice Australia, released through Universal Music Australia on 1 August 2014. It consists of covers of songs performed on The Voice, as well as four new covers.

Commercial performance
Anja Nissen debuted at number 11 on the ARIA Albums Chart with first week sales of 1,952 copies.

Track listing

Charts

References

2014 debut albums
Anja Nissen albums
Covers albums
Albums produced by will.i.am